The 1950s quiz show scandals were a series of scandals involving the producers and contestants of several popular American television quiz shows. These shows' producers secretly gave assistance to certain contestants in order to prearrange the shows’ outcomes while still attempting to deceive the public into believing that these shows were objective and fair competitions. Producers fixed the shows sometimes with the free consent of contestants and out of various motives: improving ratings, greed, and the lack of regulations prohibiting such conspiracy in game show productions.

The scandals took place at a time when television was still emerging as a medium and had yet to become the established cultural force in American society that it is today. When the behavior of the producers and contestants was exposed, the public reacted with shock. Many expressed concern about the potential for the young medium of television to influence society in negative ways.

In response to the scandals, the government was widely pressured to impose stricter regulations on broadcasters. As a direct consequence, Congress amended the Communications Act of 1934 to prohibit networks from prearranging the outcomes of quiz shows. In the United States, it has since become standard industry practice for game show producers to monitor their own shows closely for cheating and to ensure fairness in play and compliance with broadcasting law to the highest degree possible.

Background
The popularity of radio quiz shows between 1938 and 1956 led to the creation of television quiz shows, which became the successors to their radio antecedents. In 1954, the U.S. Supreme Court ruled that radio and television quiz shows could give prizes to contestants, provided that they did not contribute any of their own money.

In September 1956, the Jack Barry-hosted game show Twenty-One premiered on NBC, its first show being played legitimately with no manipulation of the game by the producers at all. That initial broadcast was, in the words of co-producer Dan Enright, "a dismal failure", as the two contestants were so lacking in the required knowledge that they answered a large number of the questions incorrectly. Show sponsor Geritol, upon seeing this opening-night performance, reportedly became furious with the results and said in no uncertain terms that they did not want to see a repeat performance.

Three months into its run, Twenty-One featured a contestant, Herb Stempel, who had been coached by Enright to allow his opponent, Charles Van Doren, to win the game. Stempel took the fall as requested. A year later, Stempel told the New York Journal-Americans Jack O'Brian that his winning run as champion on the series had been choreographed to his advantage, and that the show's producer then ordered him to purposely lose his championship to Van Doren. With no proof, an article was never printed.

Stempel's statements gained more credibility when fixing in another game, Dotto, was publicized in August 1958. Quiz show ratings across the networks plummeted and several were cancelled amid allegations of fixing. The revelations were sufficient to initiate a nine-month long New York County grand jury. No indictments were handed down, and the findings of the grand jury were sealed by judge's order. A formal congressional subcommittee investigation began in August 1959. Enright was revealed to have rigged Twenty-One; Van Doren also eventually came forth with revelations about how he was persuaded to accept specific answers during his time on the show.

In 1960, Congress amended the Communications Act of 1934 to prohibit the fixing of quiz shows. As a result of that action, many networks canceled their existing quiz shows and replaced them with a higher number of public service programs.

Integrity questioned (1957–1958)

Twenty-One 
In late 1956, Herb Stempel, a contestant on NBC's Twenty-One, was coached by Enright. While Stempel was in the midst of his winning streak, both of the $64,000 quiz shows (The $64,000 Question and its spin-off, The $64,000 Challenge) were in the top-ten rated programs but Twenty-One did not have the same popularity. Enright and his partner, Albert Freedman, were searching for a new champion to replace Stempel to boost ratings. They soon found what they were looking for in Van Doren, an English teacher at Columbia University. Van Doren decided to try out for the NBC quiz show Tic-Tac-Dough. Enright, who produced both Tic-Tac-Dough and Twenty-One, saw his tryout and was familiar with his prestigious family background that included multiple Pulitzer Prize-winning authors and highly respected professors at Columbia. As a result, Enright felt that Van Doren would be perfect as the new face of Twenty-One.

After achieving winnings of $69,500, Stempel's scripted loss to the more popular Van Doren occurred on December 5, 1956. One of the questions Stempel answered incorrectly involved the winner of the 1955 Academy Award for Best Motion Picture. The correct answer was Marty, one of Stempel's favorite movies. As instructed by Enright, however, he gave the incorrect answer On the Waterfront, which had won the previous year. Although the manipulation of the contestants helped the producers maintain viewer interest and ratings, the producers had not anticipated the extent of Stempel's resentment at being required to lose the contest against Van Doren.

The Big Surprise 
In December 1956, Dale Logue, a contestant on NBC's The Big Surprise, filed a lawsuit against the show's production company, Entertainment Productions, Inc., seeking either $103,000 in damages or reinstatement on the show as a contestant. Her claim was that, after being asked a question she did not know in a "warm-up" session, that she was asked the same question again during the televised show. Her assertion was that this was done intentionally with the express purpose of eliminating her as a contestant. At the time Logue's lawsuit was filed, Steve Carlin, executive producer of Entertainment Productions, Inc., called her claim "ridiculous and hopeless". Assertions that Logue had been offered $10,000 to settle in January 1957 were called baseless. Charles Revson, head of Revlon and The Big Surprise's primary sponsor, asked the producers if Logue's accusation was true, and was told that it was not.

In April 1957, Time magazine published an article detailing the depths to which producers managed game shows, just short of involving the contestants themselves. This was followed by the August 20, 1957, Look magazine article "Are TV Quiz Shows Fixed?", which concluded "it may be more accurate to say they are controlled or partially controlled."

Dotto 
In August 1958, Stempel and Logue's credibility was bolstered when Edward Hilgemeier, Jr, a stand-by contestant on Dotto three months earlier, sent an affidavit to the FCC claiming that while backstage, he had found a notebook on set containing the answers contestant Marie Winn was to deliver.

Backlash
The American public's reaction was swift and dramatic when the fraud became public; between 87% and 95% knew about the scandals as measured by industry-sponsored polls. Through late 1958 and early 1959, quiz shows implicated by the scandal were quickly cancelled. Among them, with their last-aired dates, were:
 Dotto (August 15, 1958)
 The $64,000 Challenge (September 7)
 Twenty-One (October 16)
 The $64,000 Question (November 2)
 Tic-Tac-Dough, primetime edition (December 29)
For Love or Money (January 30, 1959)

In late August 1958, New York prosecutor Joseph Stone convened a grand jury to investigate the allegations of the fixing of quiz shows. At the time of the empaneling, neither being a party to a fixed game show nor fixing a game show in the first place were crimes in their own right. Some witnesses in the grand jury acknowledged their role in a fixed show, while others denied it, directly contradicting one another. Many of the coached contestants, who had become celebrities due to their quiz-show success, were so afraid of the social repercussions of admitting the fraud that they were unwilling to confess to having been coached, even to the point of perjuring themselves to avoid backlash. Producers who had legally rigged the games to increase ratings, but did not want to implicate themselves, their sponsors, or the networks in doing so, categorically denied the allegations. After the 9-month grand jury, no indictments were handed down and the judge sealed the grand jury report in August 1959. In October 1959, the House Subcommittee on Legislative Oversight, under Representative Oren Harris's chairmanship, began to hold hearings to investigate the scandal. Stempel, Snodgrass, and Hilgemeier all testified.

The expansion of the probe led CBS president Frank Stanton to immediately announce cancellation of three more of its large-prize quiz shows between October 16 and October 19, 1959: Top Dollar, The Big Payoff, and Name That Tune, explaining that this decision was made "because of the impossibility of guarding against dishonest practice". On November 2 when Van Doren said to the Committee in a nationally televised session that, "I was involved, deeply involved, in a deception. The fact that I, too, was very much deceived cannot keep me from being the principal victim of that deception, because I was its principal symbol."

Aftermath

Law and politics
All of the regulations regarding television in the late 1950s were defined under the Communications Act of 1934, which dealt with the advertising, fair competition, and labeling of broadcast stations. The act and regulations written by the FCC were indefinite in regard to fixed television programs. Because no specific laws existed regarding the fraudulent behavior in the quiz shows, whether the producers or contestants alike did anything illegal is debatable. Instead, one inference could be that the medium was ill-used. After concluding the Harris Commission investigation, Congress amended the Communications Act to prohibit the fixing of televised contests of intellectual knowledge or skill.

President Dwight D. Eisenhower signed the bill into law on September 13, 1960. The legislation allowed the FCC to require license renewals of less than the legally required three years if the agency believes it would be in the public interest, prohibited gifts to FCC members, and declared illegal any contest or game with intent to deceive the audience.

Contestants
Many quiz-show contestants' reputations were ruined, including:
 Charles Van Doren, who had become a regular on NBC's Today, lost his job in the television industry. He was also forced to resign his professorship at Columbia University. Van Doren took a job as an editor at Encyclopædia Britannica and continued working as an editor and writer until his retirement in 1982. He refused requests for interviews for more than three decades and chose not to participate in the production of The Quiz Show Scandal, a 1992 one-hour documentary aired on PBS. He later turned down an offer of $100,000 to act as a consultant on the 1994 Robert Redford-directed feature film Quiz Show (in which Stempel played a minor role, but not as himself) after discussing the matter with family members, who with the exception of his son John, were against his participation. In 2008, Van Doren broke his silence, describing his quiz show experience in an essay-length memoir published in The New Yorker. Van Doren died on April 9, 2019. Stempel, who was his opposing contestant on Twenty-One, died a year later almost to the day.
 Teddy Nadler, whose $264,000 haul on The $64,000 Challenge stood as a record for two decades, resorted to applying for a temporary job with the United States Census Bureau when his prize money started running short; he failed the civil service exam. In 1970, producers exonerated Nadler, stating that they had shown him questions beforehand but that he already knew the answers and did not need them given to him. Nadler died on May 24, 1984.
 Leonard Ross, who at age 10 won a combined $164,000 on The Big Surprise and The $64,000 Challenge, had major mental-health issues, including depression and attention deficit disorder, which limited his ability to work as an author and attorney in adulthood; most of his work was completed by other co-authors. After an unsuccessful cingulotomy, Ross died by suicide on May 1, 1985, at age 39.

Hosts and producers
In September 1958, a New York grand jury called producers who had coached contestants to appear in testimony. A prosecutor on the case later estimated that of the 150 sworn witnesses before the panel, only 50 told the truth.

Other producers met the same fate as Barry and Enright, but were unable to redeem themselves afterwards unlike those two. One of the more notable is Cooper, whose Dotto ended up being his longest-running and most popular game. Hosts such as Jack Narz and Hal March continued to work on television after the scandals. March died in January 1970 from lung cancer. Narz, who passed a lie-detector test at the time of the Dotto affair, had an extensive career as a game-show host after the incident (which also allowed him to help his brother, James, who later took on the name Tom Kennedy, break into the television business.) Sonny Fox, the original host of The $64,000 Challenge, left long before it could become tainted and became a popular children's host in the northeast, remembered best as the suave, genial host of the Sunday-morning learn-and-laugh marathon Wonderama. (Fox later stated that his unintentional "predilection for asking the answers" was a factor in his decision to only rarely host game shows after the scandals.)

Television
The quiz-show scandals exhibited the necessity for stronger network control over programming and production. Quiz-show scandals also justified and accelerated the growth of the networks' power over television advertisers concerning licensing, scheduling, and sponsorship of programs. The networks claimed to be ignorant, and victims of the scandals. The NBC president at the time stated, "NBC was just as much a victim of the quiz-show frauds as was the public."

A big-money quiz show did not return until ABC premiered 100 Grand in 1963. It went off the air after three shows, never awarding its top prize. Quiz shows still held a stigma throughout much of the 1960s, which was eventually eased by the success of the lower-stakes and fully legitimate answer-and-question game Jeopardy! in 1964, which ran until 1975 (with a brief revival in 1978-79). A second revival was launched in 1984 that still airs to this day, with a rule that limited winning contestants to five consecutive appearances in effect from 1984 to 2003.

Big money quiz shows would not enjoy widespread popularity in the United States again until the late 1990s. In 1999, ABC launched the American adaptation of the British game show franchise, Who Wants to Be a Millionaire? to both enormous critical success and high ratings. Around the turn of 21st century, other American television networks launched similar quiz shows offering large sums of money, including Fox with Greed and NBC, who first revived Twenty-One then later adapted the British game show, The Weakest Link. In 2003, Sony Pictures Television changed the rules on Jeopardy! to allow players to win until they are defeated.  At the end of Season 20 in July 2004, contestant Ken Jennings  won over one million dollars after his thirtieth win in the first season of the rule.  He won 74 games over two seasons, and only one other player (James Holzhauer) won over one million dollars during the Alex Trebek era (until January 7, 2021). In 2008, Sony added the Australian version's Million Dollar wedge to Wheel of Fortune where a player can win a huge sum by landing on the wedge and meeting a series of standards.  Today, numerous high-stakes game shows and reality competition shows continue to air on broadcast American television.

See also
 1980 Pennsylvania Lottery scandal
 2007 British television phone-in scandal
 American game show winnings records
 College Bowl
 Martin Flood
 Charles Ingram
 R v Ingram, C., Ingram, D. and Whittock, T.
 Jay Jackson
 Manhunt (2001) and Our Little Genius (2010), later game shows that were pulled due to manipulation 
 Michael Larson
 Quizbowl
 Slumdog Millionaire
 Quiz Show

References

Further reading

External sources
 NPR Article on Radio Quiz Shows
 PBS Article on Radio Quiz Shows
 The Quiz Show Scandal
 Walter Karp: The Quiz-Show Scandal, in American Heritage, May/June 1989

1950s in American television

Entertainment scandals
Scandals in the United States
Television controversies in the United States
Match fixing